Gandino is a comune (municipality) in the Province of Bergamo in the Italian region of Lombardy, located about  northeast of Milan and about  northeast of Bergamo.  

Gandino borders the following municipalities: Casnigo, Cazzano Sant'Andrea, Cerete, Clusone, Endine Gaiano, Leffe, Peia, Ponte Nossa, Ranzanico, Rovetta, Sovere.

Notable people
Lorenzo Frana, Vatican diplomat, museum founder

References

External links

 Official website